Southern University at Shreveport (SUSLA) is a junior college in Shreveport, Louisiana.  It is part of the historically black Southern University System. SUSLA, pushed to fruition by the administration of Governor John J. McKeithen, opened for instruction on September 19, 1967. At the same time a second junior college, Louisiana State University at Shreveport, also opened. LSUS later became began offering bachelor's degrees but SUSLA remains a junior college. The university is a member-school of Thurgood Marshall College Fund.

The primary emphasis of SUSLA was to serve the Shreveport-Bossier City metro area. SUSLA is accredited by the Southern Association of Colleges and Schools to award associate degrees in various fields of study.

On October 28, 1974, the Louisiana Board of Regents, then called the Coordinating Council for Higher Education, granted to the institution approval for six associate degree programs in business, humanities, medical office assistant, natural sciences, office administration, and social sciences. In 1978, it added an associate degree in medical laboratory technology.

Among the buildings at SUSLA is Stone Hall, named for the late Southern University System president Jesse N. Stone, Jr. Inside Stone Hall is the J. Bennett Johnston, Jr. Video Conferencing Center, named for the former U.S. senator from Shreveport.

Athletics
The Port City Jaguars and Lady Jaguars are composed of 2 athletic teams representing Southern University at Shreveport in intercollegiate athletics, including men's and women's basketball. The Jaguars and Lady Jaguars compete in National Junior College Athletic Association Division I, Region 23. The SUSLA sports teams are members of the MISS-LOU Junior College Conference.

The Jaguars and Lady Jaguars basketball teams play at the Health and Physical Education Complex.

Notable alumni
Ollie Tyler, mayor of Shreveport; did graduate study at the Southern Shreveport campus

References

External links
 Official website
 Official athletics website

 
Universities and colleges accredited by the Southern Association of Colleges and Schools
Buildings and structures in Shreveport, Louisiana
Southern University
NJCAA athletics
Educational institutions established in 1967